The 1978 United States Senate election in Delaware was held on November 7, 1978. Incumbent Democratic United States Senator Joe Biden won re-election to a second term, defeating Republican challenger James H. Baxter Jr in a landslide victory. This is the first of five elections that Biden won all counties. Biden went on to become Vice President, and later President. Biden, the youngest senator at the time of his first reelection, is currently the oldest serving President.

Republican primary 
The Republican Party primary would be held on September 9, 1978. Venema was previously an independent before declaring himself a candidate in March 1978. Both candidates: Venema and Baxter were described by The Washington Post as being "two think-alike Reagan conservatives" but differed in terms of background and "personal style".

Candidates 

 James H. Baxter Jr., Sussex County Recorder of Deeds
 James Allyn Venema, cardboard sign manufacturer, anti desegregation busing advocate, president of the Positive Action Committee and the National Association of Neighborhood Schools.

Results

General election

Candidates 
 Joe Biden (D), incumbent Delaware Senator running for his first reelection
 James H. Baxter Jr. (R), Sussex County Recorder of Deeds
 Donald G. Gies (A), engineer, perennial candidate and officer in the US Air Force Reserve.

Results

County results

Results by state representative district

See also 
 1978 United States Senate elections

References 

1978
Delaware
1978 Delaware elections
s